Loricariichthys microdon is a species of catfish in the family Loricariidae. It is native to South America, where it occurs in the Rupununi basin in Guyana. The species reaches 11 cm (4.3 inches) in length and is believed to be a facultative air-breather.

References 

Loricariini
Fish described in 1909
Taxobox binomials not recognized by IUCN